Joseph-Nicolas Robert-Fleury (8 August 17975 May 1890) was a  French painter.

Biography
Born in Cologne, he was sent by his family to Paris, and after travelling in Italy returned to France and made his first appearance at the Salon in 1824; his reputation, however, was not established until three years later, when he exhibited Tasso at the Convent of Saint Onophrius.

Endowed with a vigorous original talent, and with a vivid imagination, especially for the tragic incidents of history, he soon rose to fame, and in 1850 succeeded François Granet as member of the Académie des Beaux-Arts. In 1855, he was appointed professor and in 1863 director of the École des Beaux-Arts, and in the following year he went to Rome as director of the French Academy in that city.

His pupils included Marie-Adélaïde Baubry-Vaillant, David Bles, Marguerite Jacquelin, Leon Kapliński and Henri Le Riche. His son, Tony Robert-Fleury, was also a painter.

Honours 
1887: Knight in the Order of Leopold.

Selected paintings

References

External links
 
 

1797 births
1890 deaths
Artists from Cologne
19th-century French painters
French male painters
French history painters
Members of the Académie des beaux-arts
Recipients of the Pour le Mérite (civil class)
19th-century French male artists